Schmitten may refer to:

 Schmitten, Germany, a climatic spa in the Hochtaunuskreis in Hesse, Germany
 Schmitten, Fribourg, a municipality in the canton of Fribourg, Switzerland
 Schmitten, Graubünden, a municipality in the canton of Graubünden, Switzerland
 Schmitten Discgolf Parcours, a disc golf course in Zell am See, Austria
 Schmitten Tunnel, a bypass tunnel and road tunnel in Salzburg, Austria